Salix koriyanagi 'Rubykins'  is a species of willow native to Korea. It can reach a height of  before cultivation.

Salix koriyanagi is used primarily in Japan for making baskets and furniture.

References

External links
 
 
 

koriyanagi
Trees of Korea